John Robert Baines,  (born 17 March 1946) is a retired British Egyptologist and academic. From 1976 to 2013, he was Professor of Egyptology at the University of Oxford and a fellow of The Queen's College, Oxford.

Early life
Baines was born on 17 March 1946. He is the oldest son of Edward Russell Baines and his wife Dora Margaret Jean (née O’Brien). He was educated at Winchester College, an all boys public boarding school in Winchester, Hampshire, England. He went on to study Egyptology at the University of Oxford. He graduated with a Bachelor of Arts degree (BA) in 1967, later promoted to Master of Arts (MA). He gained his Doctor of Philosophy degree (DPhil) in 1976.

Academic career
Baines was Professor of Egyptology at the University of Oxford from 1976 to 2013. He was one of the youngest professors at the university at the age of 30. He retired from full-time academia in 2013 but maintains his link with Oxford as a research associate.

Baines is the author of multiple scholarly articles and publications relating to Ancient Egypt. His research interests are in Ancient Egyptian art, religion, literature, and biographies; modelling ancient Egyptian society; comparative and anthropological approaches to ancient civilizations.

In 2011, he was elected a Fellow of the British Academy (FBA), the United Kingdom's national academy for the humanities and social sciences.

Publications
(with Jaromir Malek) Atlas of Ancient Egypt (1980) 
Fecundity Figures: Egyptian Personification and the Iconology of a Genre (1987) 
Pyramid Studies and Other Essays Presented to I.E.S. Edwards (1988) 
(Contributor) Religion in ancient Egypt: Gods, Myths, and Personal Practice" (1991) 
(Translator of Erik Hornung's), Conceptions of God in Ancient Egypt: the One and the Many (1982) Stone Vessels, Pottery and Sealings from the Tomb of Tutankhamun (1994) High Culture and Experience in Ancient Egypt  (2000) Fecundity Figures (2001) Visual and Written Culture in Ancient Egypt'' (2007)

References

External links
Home page at Oxford University
Full list of publications 1970-2008

Living people
1946 births
British Egyptologists
Fellows of The Queen's College, Oxford
Professors of Egyptology (University of Oxford)
People educated at Winchester College
Alumni of the University of Oxford
Fellows of the British Academy
Members of the American Philosophical Society